Shahjahan is a 2001 Indian Tamil-language romantic film written and directed by Ravi and produced by R. B. Choudary. The film stars Vijay and Richa Pallod while Krishna and Vivek portray supporting roles. The film, which had music was composed by Mani Sharma, was released on 14 November 2001. The story is about the love life of a love doctor and how his love life ends in a tragedy unknowingly. The movie was a commercial success.

Plot
Ashok is a young man who knows and understands the psychology of love and helps lovers elope against the wishes of their families. He is assisted in this endeavour by his close friends Boopathi Ramaiyaa and Seenu. Once he comes across Uma Maheshwari "Mahee", an engineering student, and develops a crush on her. However, he chooses not to express his love to her and instead decides to wait for her to reciprocate her love due to a past incident involving his friend Giri. In a flashback, it is shown that Giri was in love with a Muslim girl named Aisha, who did not reciprocate. When Giri declared his love for her in front of her family, Aisha committed suicide, unable to bear the humiliation faced by her and her family members. This incident caused Giri to become mad and end up in an asylum.

One day, Ashok's friend Raja asks him to help him successfully pursue a mysterious girl. Ashok agrees to this and successfully helps Raja win the heart of the "mysterious girl", who, unknown to Ashok, turns out to be none other than Mahee. Eventually, when Mahee's father finds out about the relationship, Mahee and Raja decide to elope and seek the help of Ashok again. Ashok, who is still unaware that Raja wants to marry Mahee, agrees. It is only when Mahee arrives at the register office that Ashok realises that Raja's lover is Mahee and that he had helped Raja to make his love with Mahee succeed. Ashok breaks down inconsolably, but soon calms down and gets Raja and Mahee married. The newly married couple decide to leave for Coimbatore to escape from Mahee's father's wrath. But Mahee's father notices them and attacks them as well as Ashok, since he is responsible for getting his daughter to elope. Ashok is stabbed by Mahee's father in the back. Despite his pain, Ashok manages to send Mahee and Raja away safely, and Mahee's father decides to leave him alone, since his daughter is already gone.

The movie ends with a man coming to an injured Ashok and asking him to help him in pursuing a girl he likes, to which Ashok agrees (indicating that he'll even sacrifice his own love life to unite two hearts).

Cast

Production
R. B. Choudary, after the successes of Poove Unakkaga (1996) and Thulladha Manamum Thullum (1999), signed on Vijay for a project to be directed by Vikraman. However, Vijay  opted against starring in Vikraman's venture and Ravi Appulu was roped in to make a film titled Sneha Jahan, which later became Shahjahan, named after India's 5th Mughal emperor with the same name. The director had previously approached Vikram with the script of the film. Arthur A. Wilson was signed to handle the camera, Mani Sharma to compose the music, Vairamuthu to write lyrics while Prabhakaran did the art work and Prasanna Kumar has written the dialogue.

Soundtrack
The soundtrack of the film was composed by Mani Sharma, and all lyrics were penned by Vairamuthu.

Release and reception
Shahjahan was released on 14 November 2001. Malathi Rangarajan from The Hindu gave the film a positive review claiming that "youth, romance and vibrant music seem to sell at a premium these days" and that Shahjahan "has all these in ample measure". She added that Richa "has little to do but look good" and Vijay "sparkles in the role of Ashok" while Krishna "fills the bill of a perfect non-action hero". Ananda Vikatan rated the film 36 out of 100. Kalki rated the film "above average".The song "Achchacho Punnagai" was one the most successful song which competed the hit song "You are my soniya" and instantly became popular in Box office

References

External links

2001 films
2000s Tamil-language films
Films scored by Mani Sharma
Indian romantic drama films
2001 directorial debut films
2001 romantic drama films
Super Good Films films